The Mokattam (  , also spelled Muqattam), also known as the Mukattam Mountain or Hills, is the name of an Eastern Desert plateau as well as the district built over it in the Southern Area of Cairo, Egypt.

Etymology 
The Arabic name Mokattam means cut off or broken off and apparently refers to how the low range of hills is divided into three sections. Paul Casanova advocated the idea that it's a corruption of an older name Maqaduniya, mentioned in Medieval Arabic sources, which he derives from Makhetow, one of the names of Memphis.

Landform
The highest segment is a low mountain landform called Moqattam Mountain.
In the past the low mountain range was an important ancient Egyptian quarry site for limestone, used in the construction of temples and pyramids.

Settlement

The hills are in the region of ancient Fustat, the new capital founded by 'Amr ibn al-'As after the Muslim conquest of Egypt in 642 CE. The Zabbaleen people, who are an integral part of collecting and processing Cairo's municipal solid waste, live in Manshiyat Naser, Garbage City, at the foot of the Mokattam Hills.

Municipal district and population
The Moqattam district lies in the Southern Area of Cairo, Egypt. In 2017 it had 224,138 residents in its 10 shiakhas:

Sports 
In Mokkattam like other places in Cairo the locals support either Al Ahly SC or El Zamalek, yet Mokkattam itself has a football team that plays in the Egyptian third division called Masr Le El Tammeen. Moreover, the top division club Al Mokawloon Al Arab SC actually lies on the border of the Mokkattam mountain.

Simon the Tanner

Mokattam is widely known in the Coptic Church, as it is believed that the mountain has moved up and down when the Coptic Pope Abraham of Alexandria, following the advice of Saint Simon the Tanner, performed a mass near it in order to prove to the Caliph that the Gospel is true when it says that "if one has faith like a grain of mustard one can move a mountain". The name "Broken-off Mountain" may be related to the fact that in the story the mountain breaks off from the underlying rock and rises up, before coming back down again.

See also
Maqaduniya, a region of Medieval Egypt
City of the Dead, Islamic necropolis and cemetery
List of types of limestone, ancient Egyptians quarried limestone in the hills

References

External links

 Al Mokattam Official Website

Mountains of Egypt
Geography of Cairo
Geography of Egypt